Léopold Hélène (October 16, 1926 in Le Gosier, Guadeloupe –
February 9, 2012 in Paris, France) was a politician from Guadeloupe who served in the French National Assembly from 1968-1973.

References 

1926 births
2012 deaths
People from Le Gosier
Guadeloupean politicians
Union of Democrats for the Republic politicians
Deputies of the 4th National Assembly of the French Fifth Republic
Deputies of the 5th National Assembly of the French Fifth Republic